The torso or trunk is an anatomical term for the central part, or the core, of the body of many animals (including humans), from which the head, neck, limbs, tail and other appendages extend. The tetrapod torso — including that of a human — is usually divided into the thoracic segment (also known as the upper torso, where the forelimbs extend), the abdominal segment (also known as the "mid-section" or "midriff"), and the pelvic and perineal segments (sometimes known together with the abdomen as the lower torso, where the hindlimbs extend).

Anatomy

Major organs

In humans, most critical organs, with the notable exception of the brain, are housed within the torso. In the upper chest, the heart and lungs are protected by the rib cage, and the abdomen contains most of the organs responsible for digestion: the stomach, which breaks down partially digested food via gastric acid; the liver, which respectively produces bile necessary for digestion; the large and small intestines, which extract nutrients from food; the anus, from which fecal wastes are egested; the rectum, which stores feces; the gallbladder, which stores and concentrates bile; the kidneys, which produce urine, the ureters, which pass it to the bladder for storage; and the urethra, which excretes urine and in a male passes sperm through the seminal vesicles. Finally, the pelvic region houses both the male and female reproductive organs.

Major muscle groups
The torso also harbours many of the main groups of muscles in the tetrapod body, including the pectoral, abdominal, lateral and epaxial muscles.

Nerve supply
The organs, muscles, and other contents of the torso are supplied by nerves, which mainly originate as nerve roots from the thoracic and lumbar parts of the spinal cord. Some organs also receive a nerve supply from the vagus nerve. The sensation to the skin is provided by the lateral and dorsal cutaneous branches.

See also

 Belly cast
 Waist
 Belvedere Torso

References